Chapecó is a municipality in the state of Santa Catarina, in the Southern Region of Brazil. Being a major industrial, financial and educational center, it is a major producer of industrialized food products. Considered a medium city, with a population estimated at 224,013 inhabitants, it is among the four most important cities in the state. It belongs to the Meso-region of Western Santa Catarina and to the Microregion of Chapecó.

Distant 550 km from the state capital, Florianópolis, it is Headquarters of the Metropolitan Region of Chapecó, and exerts significant influence not only in the Catarinense West but also in the Northwest Rio Grande do Sul and Southwest of Paraná, from an economic, cultural, or political point of view.

Chapecó became known worldwide through its association football club Chapecoense and the aftermath of LaMia Flight 2933 which killed 71, including most of the team's roster and staff.

With the titles of "Brazil's agribusiness capital" and "Brazil's business tourism capital", the planned town constructed in the form of a chess grid also has universities attracting students from all over Brazil. The main educational institutions are UFFS, UCEFF, UNOCHAPECÓ, UNOESC and UDESC.

History 

Until the 19th century, the area around Chapecó land was under indigenous (mainly Kaingang) and Spanish control, mostly unoccupied by European people and subject to border issues and armed conflicts. Brazilian control was in fact established as a military colony in 1882. Its official status as a municipality was established by state government decree after the Contestado War on August 25, 1917. Its area was then given to a private colonization company which began selling land to people coming mainly from the neighboring state of Rio Grande do Sul. Most of its inhabitants are descended from Italian, German and Polish immigrants.

Demography 

The region has always been the subject of disputes because of its strategic importance as a border region. During the Contestado War, airplanes were used for the first time in the history of America for the purpose of recognition and support for war operations. Colonized by Italian and German immigrants, mainly from Rio Grande do Sul, Paraná, São Paulo and the coast of Santa Catarina, the city today attracts several inhabitants thanks to its development.

It is one of the cities with the highest number (in percentage) of buildings in Santa Catarina. According to the IBGE, Chapecó has almost 16% of its population living in apartments, gaining in percentage of cities such as Joinville, Itajaí and Blumenau.

Economy 

This region of the state is home of some of the largest meat processing and exporting industrial enterprises such as Sadia and Seara Foods; the farmers are organized in agricultural cooperatives. Chapecó is known as a Brazilian agro-industrial capital, specialized in pork, poultry and technology involved. The city is headquarters of Aurora Central Cooperative and has a plant of BRF S.A. since 1973.

Other major economic sectors are metal mechanics specialized in equipment for slaughterhouses and transportation, plastics and packaging, furniture, beverages, software development and biotechnology. Civil construction and trade are also important source of income.

Chapecó is served by Serafin Enoss Bertaso Airport.

Culture

Sports

Football is the great passion of the Chapecoenses. The Chapecoense Football Association, known among its fans as a "Hurricane from the west", Chape and verdão, a team from Santa Catarina, has as its last title the Campeonato Catarinense de Futebol de 2020 - Série A. Its headquarters is in Arena Condám, with a capacity of over 22,000 people and located in the East Zone of the city. The team had spent three consecutive years in the C Series of the Brazilian Championship (2010, 2011 and 2012), before beginning a rapid rise through the Brazilian football pyramid by reaching the second division in 2013 and entering the Serie A Brasileirão in 2014, where it currently resides. The team was among the best teams in South America, reaching the quarterfinals of the 2015 Copa Sudamericana and reaching the final of the 2016 Copa Sudamericana.

On November 29, 2016, Chapecoense team members and staff boarded LaMia Flight 2933 to play the first leg of the 2016 Copa Sudamericana Finals against Atlético Nacional in Medellín, Colombia.  The plane crashed in the mountains a few miles south of the city. Seventy-one of the seventy-seven people on board died, including all of the club's coaching staff and all but three of the players. A wave of commotion abated in the football world in the days and weeks after, playing tribute to the club; Atlético Nacional requested that CONMEBOL, the governing football association for South America, award the 2016 title to Chapecoense, which was granted.

Other 
The city is the seat of the Roman Catholic Diocese of Chapecó.

Twin towns – sister cities

Chapecó is twinned with:
 Asunción, Paraguay
 La Unión, Colombia
 Medellín, Colombia
 Ninghai, China
 Pergamino, Argentina

See also 
 Federal University of Fronteira Sul

References

External links
 Mercoagro - International Meat Processing Fair 
 Aurora Central Cooperative
 Prefeitura de Chapeco 
 Unochapecó - Universidade Comunitária Regional de Chapecó, local university 
 Unoesc - Universidade do Oeste de Santa Catarina 

Municipalities in Santa Catarina (state)
Planned cities in Brazil